Bronwyn Jones may refer to:

Eve Libertine, real name Bronwyn Jones
Bronwyn Jones, character in Fireman Sam